Rhabdosargus holubi, the Cape stumpnose, is a species of fish in the seabream family, Sparidae. It is native to southern Africa, where it can be found mainly along the eastern coast of South Africa.

This fish is usually around 15 centimeters long, but specimens of 40 centimeters have been seen. It is a shiny silver fish with a gold line from head to tail. The dorsal fin has 11 spines. The head is blunt and the mouth contains 6 to 8 incisors. The incisors of the juvenile have cusps.

This species is a marine fish, with adults mainly living in the ocean and juveniles developing in estuaries. The juveniles migrate into the estuaries and generally spend their first year of life there. Some adults can be found in estuaries, as well. Many estuaries of the southeastern African coast are not permanently open, but become blocked by shoals built up by tides and wind. They open for short periods after rainfall causes the rivers to rise and flow into the sea. At this time the fish enter the estuaries and are contained when they close again. Within the estuary, the juveniles dwell in eelgrass beds, a habitat where they find protection and a food supply.

The fish feeds during the day. The diet of the adult is made up of bivalves and crustaceans. The juvenile grazes on vegetation. Its cusped teeth help it collect aquatic plant matter. The most commonly consumed plant is the eelgrass Zostera capensis (syn. Nanozostera capensis). It does not digest the plants, however. It digests the minute life forms stuck to them, such as diatoms, bryozoans, amphipods, and polychaetes. Diatoms, for example may make up 50% of the dry weight of the matter the fish consumes. After absorbing the useful food items the fish excretes the indigestible plant matter.

This is a common fish in its range, one of the most abundant in some areas. It inhabits estuaries such as the Kowie, the Msikaba, the West Kleinemond, the Kasouga, the Swartkops, and the Kromme.

While some sources state that it is a desirable food fish, others report that fishermen are not interested in it because it is too small.

References

Cape stumpnose
Marine fish of South Africa
Cape stumpnose